Bilminy  is a village in the administrative district of Gmina Kuźnica, within Sokółka County, Podlaskie Voivodeship, in northeastern Poland, near the border with Belarus.

References

Bilminy